Michael Jackson's Halloween is a one-hour animated television special that premiered on CBS on October 27, 2017. It was produced by Splash Entertainment.

The cast of voice actors includes Lucas Till, Kiersey Clemons, Jim Parsons, George Eads, Alan Cumming, Christine Baranski, Lucy Liu, and Brad Garrett. The special also features Michael Jackson's music, and a dance finale depicting Jackson himself.

The special was produced in collaboration with the Michael Jackson estate. John Branca and John MacClain, co-executors of the Estate of Michael Jackson, serve as executive producers. It is produced by Daniel Chuba and directed by Mark A.Z. Dippé. The special was created and produced by Optimum Productions, the company owned by Jackson's estate, with animation production by Hammerhead.

Plot 
A young man and woman, Vincent (Lucas Till) and Victoria (Kiersey Clemons), cross paths on Halloween night. As a result of their meeting, they and Victoria's boss' dog, Ichabod, find themselves in a "magical adventure of personal discovery" at the This Place Hotel, located at 777 Jackson Street. They meet the bellhop chimp Bubbles (Brad Garrett), the scarecrow groundskeeper Hay Man (Jim Parsons), spider security guard Generalissimo Meriweather (Alan Cumming), and mad scientist cat Franklin Stein (Diedrich Bader) who they join in stopping the tyrannical witch Conformity (Lucy Liu) from getting rid of music and dancing.

The story culminates in a dance finale featuring an animated version of Michael Jackson himself (voiced using his music and archival recordings).

Characters 
Michael Jackson - The King of Pop himself and a mysterious magical figure who creates 777 Jackson Street Palace Hotel who aids Vincent and Victoria in defeating Conformity, encouraging them to follow their dreams. Possesses the power to transform into various creatures and the ability to undo the effects of Conformity's magic.
Bubbles (voiced by Brad Garrett) - Michael's talking chimp and chauffeur who works as a bellhop at the This Place Hotel. Acts as Vincent and Victoria's guide through the hotel using a magical elevator. 
Vincent (voiced by Lucas Till) - A young store clerk who wishes to be a DJ but his father wants him to takeover the family business.
Victoria (voiced by Kiersey Clemons) - A young intern who gave up dancing to be an intern at a big corporation run by her boss Mrs. Grau. 
Ichabod - Mrs. Grau's dog who Victoria ends up walking and joins the pair in their adventure. Nicknamed Icky by Victoria.
Conformity (voiced by Lucy Liu) - A tyrannical witch who rules over the inhabitants of the This Place Hotel. She forces them to conform under the threat of turning those who defy her into zombies forbidding dancing and wishes to destroy music.
Hay Man (voiced by Jim Parsons) - The magical scarecrow groundskeeper with a pumpkin for a head who aids Vincent and Victoria.
Generalissimo Meriweather (voiced by Alan Cumming) - The spider head of security who works for Conformity and leads an army of spider guards. Like Vincent, he comes from a long line of spider security guards. Victoria tricks him into dancing after stating she could do better. After one of his soldiers takes a blast of magic from Conformity to protect Generalissimo, he rebels against Conformity. 
Franklin Stein (voiced by Diedrich Bader) - A mad scientist cat who works for Conformity and built a machine that destroys music. However, after he is captured by Vincent and Victoria, he reveals that he really wanted to make music before meeting Conformity and joins forces with the pair who use his machine to summon Michael Jackson.
Vincent's Dad (voiced by George Eads) - A grocery store owner and manager who wants Vincent to follow in his footsteps and takeover the family business. However, he apparently has a change of heart as he is later seen at Vincent and Victoria's concert.
Mrs. Grau (voiced by Christine Baranski) - Victoria's boss and owner of Ichabod who she dotes on. She gives Victoria the task of walking Ichabod, promising her a promotion. She and Ichabod later attend Vincent and Victoria's concert.

Music 
This Halloween animated special features 28 songs, including some remixes, from Michael Jackson and The Jacksons catalogue, re-imagined and remixed by the producer from former "Immortal World Tour" and "Michael Jackson: One" projects Kevin Antunes.

Production 
John Branca had an extensive period working with Michael Jackson that started in 1980, which included work on the singer's iconic Thriller music video. Branca claimed the singer "loved Halloween," as he incorporated horror imagery in Thriller as well as another one of his short films named Ghosts; in 2016, this plus a recurring re-interest of Thriller every halloween influenced the idea of a halloween special featuring Jackson's music, "something that Michael wanted to do" according to Branca, into the minds of Branca and director Mark A.Z. Dippé.

Some of the film's companies and production staff previously collaborated with Jackson in the past; song compiler Kevin Antunes was involved as musical designer in the artist's Cirque du Soleil shows, and CBS had a history of television projects starring him. The dancers and choreographers who worked on the motion capture-animated dance segments were also Jackson veterans. CBS was involved in the casting, recommending actors such as Lucy Liu, Jim Parsons and Alan Cummings. L.L. Cool J was also approached for the project, although doesn't appear in the special.

Marketing 
A sneak preview of the special was shown on October 5, 2017 at the New York Comic Con, which was followed by a Q&A panel with the creators.

Reception 
On its premiere airing, the special was watched by 5.67 million viewers. The special was broadcast again in 2018 and was watched by 2.03 million viewers.

References

External links

2017 television specials
CBS television specials
Michael Jackson
2017 computer-animated films
2010s animated television specials
Halloween television specials
2010s American television specials
Works set in hotels
Witchcraft in television